Toshiro Mayuzumi (黛 敏郎 Mayuzumi Toshirō ; 20 February 1929 – 10 April 1997) was a Japanese composer known for his implementation of avant-garde instrumentation alongside traditional Japanese musical techniques. His works drew inspiration from a variety of sources ranging from jazz to Balinese music, and he was considered a pioneer in the realm of musique concrète and electronic music, being the first artist in his country to explore these techniques. In the span of his career, his works included symphonies, ballets, operas, and film scores, and was the recipient of an Otaka prize by the NHK Symphony Orchestra and the Purple Medal of Merit.

Biography
Born in Yokohama, Mayuzumi was a student of Tomojirō Ikenouchi and Akira Ifukube at the Tokyo National University of Fine Arts and Music immediately following the Second World War, graduating in 1951. He then went to Europe where he attended the Paris Conservatoire national supérieur de musique, studying with Aubin and becoming familiar with the new developments of Olivier Messiaen and Pierre Boulez, as well as with the techniques of musique concrète

He was initially enthusiastic about avant-garde Western music, especially that of Varèse, but beginning in 1957 he turned to pan-Asianism for new sonorous material.

A prolific composer for the cinema, he composed more than a hundred film scores between Waga ya wa tanoshi (It's Great to Be Young) in 1951 and Jo no mai in 1984. The best-known film with a score by Mayuzumi is probably The Bible: In the Beginning... (1966), for which he was nominated for an Academy Award and a Golden Globe Award for Best Original Score. He also wrote many pieces for wind band that have been recorded by the Tokyo Kosei Wind Orchestra.

Mayuzumi was the recipient of a Suntory Music Award in 1996. He died in Kawasaki, Kanagawa in 1997.

Works

Operas
Kinkakuji (Der Tempelbrand; The Golden Pavilion) (1976, Berlin)
Kojiki (Days of the Gods) (1996, Linz)

Ballet
Bugaku (1962)
Olympics (1965)
The Kabuki (1986)
M (1996)

Orchestral works
 Rumba Rhapsody (1948)
 Symphonic Mood (1950)
 Bacchanale (1954)
 Ektoplasm (1954)
 Tonepleromas 55 (1955)
 phonology Symphonique (1957)
 Nirvana Symphony for male chorus and orchestra (1958)
 Mandala Symphony (1960)
 Echigojishi (1960)
 Music with Sculpture (1961)
 Textures for wind orchestra (1962)
 Samsara (1962)
 Essay in Sonorities (Mozartiana) (1963)
 Essay for string orchestra (1963)
 Fireworks (1963)
 Ongaku no tanjō [Birth of Music] (1964)
 Concerto for percussion and wind orchestra (1965)
 Concertino for xylophone and orchestra (1965)
 Shu [Incantation] (1967)
 Tateyama (1974)
 ARIA in G for Solo Violin and Orchestra (1978)
 Capriccio for Solo Violin and String Orchestra (1988)
 Mukyūdō [Perpetual Motion] (1989)

Ensemble/Instrumental works
 Sonata, for violin and piano (1946)
 Twelve Preludes, for piano (1946)
 Hors d'œuvre, for piano (1947)
 Divertimento, for 10 instruments (1948)
 String Quartet (1952)
 Sextet, for flute, clarinet, bass clarinet, horn, trumpet, and piano (1955)
 Pieces, for prepared piano and string quartet (1957)
 Mikrokosmos, for clavioline, guitar, musical saw, vibraphone, xylophone, percussion, and piano (1957)
 Bunraku, for violoncello solo (1960)
 Prelude, for string quartet](1961)
 Metamusic, for saxophone, violin, and piano (1961)
 Shōwa Ten-pyō Raku, for gagaku ensemble (1970)
 Rokudan, for harp (1989)

Electronic music
X, Y, Z for musique concrète (1953)
Boxing for Radio Drama (1954)
Music for Sine Wave by Proportion of Prime Number (1955)
Music for Modulated Wave by Proportion of Prime Number (1955)
Invention for Square Wave and Saw-tooth Wave (1955)
Variations on Numerical Principle of 7 (1956; with Makoto Moroi)
Aoi no ue (1957)
Campanology for multi-piano (1959)
Olympic Campanology (1964)
Mandala for solo voice and electronic sounds (1969)

Film scores
 Waga ya wa Tanoshi (1951)
 The Woman in the Rumor (噂の女 Uwasa no onna) (1954)
 Street of Shame (1956)
 The Balloon (1956)
 Enjō (1958)
 Stolen Desire (1958)
 When a Woman Ascends the Stairs (1960)
 The Warped Ones (1960)
 Black Sun (1964)
 Tokyo Olympiad (1965)
 The Pornographers (1966)
 The Bible: In the Beginning... (1966)
 Reflections in a Golden Eye (1967)
 Thirst for Love (1967)
 Profound Desires of the Gods (1968)
 Jo no Mai (1984)

References

Sources

Further reading
 Heifetz, Robin J. 1984. "East-West Synthesis in Japanese Composition: 1950-1970". The Journal of Musicology 3, no. 4 (Autumn): 443–455.
 Loubet, Emmanuelle, Curtis Roads, and Brigitte Robindoré. 1997. "The Beginnings of Electronic Music in Japan, with a Focus on the NHK Studio: The 1950s and 1960s". Computer Music Journal 21, no. 4 (Winter): 11–22.

External links
"Overtones of Progress, Undertones of Reaction: Toshiro Mayuzumi and the Nirvana Symphony"  by Peter Burt
Music of Toshiro Mayuzumi 
 

1929 births
1997 deaths
20th-century classical composers
20th-century Japanese composers
20th-century Japanese male musicians
Ballet composers
Concert band composers
Japanese classical composers
Japanese film score composers
Japanese male classical composers
Japanese male film score composers
Japanese opera composers
Male opera composers
Monument Records artists
Tokyo Music School alumni